The 2018–19 Hobart Hurricanes Women's season was the fourth in the team's history. Coached by Salliann Briggs and captained by Sasha Moloney, the Hurricanes finished on the bottom of the WBBL04 ladder. They consequently claimed their second-consecutive wooden spoon, having also finished last in the previous season.

Squad 
Each 2018–19 squad featured 15 active players, with an allowance of up to five marquee signings including a maximum of three from overseas. Under a new rule, Australian marquees were classed as players who held a national women's team contract at the time of signing on for their WBBL|04 team.

Personnel changes made before and during the season included:
 Salliann Briggs was appointed head coach of the Hurricanes, replacing Julia Price.
 Sasha Moloney assumed the captaincy, taking over from Corinne Hall.
 Indian marquee Veda Krishnamurthy and English marquee Lauren Winfield did not re-sign with the Hurricanes.
 English marquee Heather Knight returned to the Hurricanes after a season's absence.
 Barbadian marquee Hayley Matthews returned for her fourth season. Her campaign, however, was marred by injury. She did not play the first game due to a broken toe, and then missed the last eleven matches after sustaining a ruptured medial collateral ligament. English marquee Alex Hartley was signed as her replacement.
 Indian marquee Smriti Mandhana signed with the Hurricanes, having previously played for the Brisbane Heat.
 Nicola Hancock departed the Hurricanes, signing with the Melbourne Stars.
 Australian-born Celeste Raack, who also held an Irish passport, became ineligible to compete in the league as a local player after earning international selection for Ireland during 2018. The Hurricanes opted against signing her as an overseas marquee for WBBL|04, bringing her time with the team to an end.
 Rhiann O'Donnell signed with the Hurricanes, having spent prior seasons with the Melbourne Renegades.
 On 14 December 2018, Mikayla Hinkley, a former member of the Sydney Thunder and the Perth Scorchers, was brought into the squad as a replacement for Emma Thompson who would miss the season due to injury.

The table below lists the Hurricanes players and their key stats (including runs scored, batting strike rate, wickets taken, economy rate, catches and stumpings) for the season.

Ladder

Fixtures 

All times are local time

Statistics and awards 

 Most runs: Heather Knight – 374 (equal 9th in the league)
 Highest score in an innings: Heather Knight – 82* (55) vs Melbourne Stars, 8 December 2018
 Most wickets: Brooke Hepburn – 15 (equal 10th in the league)
 Best bowling figures in an innings: Heather Knight – 3/10 (3 overs) vs Melbourne Stars, 9 December 2018
 Most catches (fielder): Heather Knight – 11 (1st in the league)
 Player of the Match awards: Corinne Hall, Smriti Mandhana – 1 each
 Hurricanes Player of the Tournament: Heather Knight

References 

2018–19 Women's Big Bash League season by team
Hobart Hurricanes (WBBL)